Heave compensation is technology applied to minimising the vertical movement of a load supported by lifting gear mounted on a heaving platform.

There are two basic types:
Active heave compensation, has a control system that uses power to drive the lifting gear to keep the load stabilised along the vertical axis to compensate for any movement of the platform specific point, using power to gain positional accuracy. 
Passive heave compensation uses a relatively soft spring which isolates the load from most of the vertical force variation to reduce transmissibility of transient loads.
Balanced heave compensation converts the non-linear force of a gas spring or hydro-pneumatic spring into an adjustable, substantially linear force supporting the load.